Yanina "Yana" Farkhadovna Batyrshina (born 7 October 1979) is a former individual rhythmic gymnast who competed for Russia. She is the 1996 Olympics All-around silver medalist, two time (1995,1997) World All-around bronze medalist, two-time European (1996, 1995) All-around silver medalist, the 1998 European All-around bronze medalist and 1996 Grand Prix Final All-around champion.

She was awarded the Medal of the Order  For Merit to the Fatherland 2nd class (1997).

Personal life 
Batyrshina is of Tatar and Jewish descent. She studied physical education at the Kharkov Institute. She is married to Azerbaijani-Jewish businessman Timur Weinstein; they have two daughters and one son together.

Career 
Batyrshina started gymnastics training at 5 years old when a rhythmic gymnast coach approached her father and told the family she was ideal gymnastics material. At 9 years of age, Batyrchina moved to Russia with then Uzbek coach Irina Viner, who became the Russian national team head coach.

Batyrchina burst onto the international scene in 1993, when she finished second all-around at the European Junior Championships.   She also won gold in the individual apparatus finals with rope and clubs, and silver with ball and ribbon.

In 1995, Batyrshina made her senior international breakthrough in Grand Prix events, collecting a total of 15 medals. At the 1995 World Championships, she won the bronze medal in all-around and also took home golds for the team competition and ball. Her results fluctuated in 1996, but she still managed to take the silver medal for the all-around and ball at the 1996 European Championships. At the event finals of 1996 World Championships, she won the silver medal in ribbon.

Batyrshina competed at the 1996 Summer Olympics, but she had a rough start at the preliminaries. She wept bitterly after several errant catches left her sitting in 13th place in preliminaries but since the top 20 advanced to semifinals, she redeemed her poor preliminary results and set her up perfectly for finals. But during her last event exercise, ribbon, she lost focus in the midst of a simple hand-to-hand exchange and dropped the apparatus. Batyrshina scored 9.683, putting her into second place overall ahead of Ukrainian Olena Vitrichenko.

Batyrchina polished off her 1996 season with a win in the all-around at the 1996 Grand Prix Final (tied with Yekaterina Serebrianskaya), a huge coup considering the depth of the field. She parlayed her success into a medal-winning 1997, including several Grand Prix golds. Despite her success and desire to continuing competing through the 2000 Olympics, 1998 presented a new challenge for Batyrshina in the form of up-and-coming new Russian teammate Alina Kabaeva. Kabaeva would go on to win the 1998 European Championships, while Batyrshina would struggle with ribbon and finish third in the all-around. Batyrshina picked up three more medals in apparatus finals with a gold in rope, silver with hoop, and bronze with ribbon but, according to coach Viner, Batyrshina was beginning to feel that there was not enough room for both her and Kabaeva at the top. Batyrshina quietly retired a short time after Europeans, at 19 years of age.

After her retirement, Batyrshina began coaching. In 1999, she was briefly invited to serve as a trainer at the UNOPAR gym in Londrina, Brazil, helping prepare the Brazilian group for the 2000 Summer Olympics in Sydney.

On 15 February 2015, a star-studded gala was held in Russia for the 80th founding anniversary of Rhythmic Gymnastics. The venue was held in the historical Mariinsky Theatre in St. Petersburg. Among those who performed at the gala were Russian former Olympic champions, Olympic medalists and World champions including: Batyrshina, Evgenia Kanaeva, Yulia Barsukova, Irina Tchachina, and Daria Dmitrieva.

Records 
 Youngest rhythmic gymnast to win the Grand Prix Final all-around title (1996 Vienna) at 16 years of age.

Influence 
Batyrshina is arguably one of the most popular rhythmic gymnast of her decade. Her winning style has altered the direction of rhythmic gymnastics in Russia as well as the rest of the world. Well known for her undeniable flexibility and personality, Batyrchina was also hailed for a top-notch level of difficulty and high, oversplit leaps and jumps. She included many flexibility skills in her routines, the majority of which highlighted her spectacularly elastic back.

Detailed Olympic results

See also
 List of select Jewish gymnasts

References
 Catalano, Robin. Gymnastics Greats, Yanina Batyrshina (RUS).

External links
 
 Yana Batyrshina at r-gymnastics.com 
 Official website 
 

1979 births
Living people
Russian people of Jewish descent
Russian rhythmic gymnasts
Olympic gymnasts of Russia
Gymnasts at the 1996 Summer Olympics
Olympic silver medalists for Russia
Sportspeople from Tashkent
Jewish gymnasts
Olympic medalists in gymnastics
Tatar people of Russia
Medalists at the 1996 Summer Olympics
Medalists at the Rhythmic Gymnastics World Championships
Recipients of the Medal of the Order "For Merit to the Fatherland" II class